Multi-agency Coordination Systems (MACS) are a part of the United States standardized Incident Command System.
MACS provides the basic architecture for facilitating the allocation of resources, incident prioritization, coordination and integration of multiple agencies for large-scale incidents and emergencies.

Functions and responsibilities
The principal functions and responsibilities of MAC entities typically include the following:
Ensuring that each agency involved in incident management activities is providing appropriate situational awareness and resource status information;
Establishing priorities between incidents and/or Area Commands in concert with Incident Commanders or a Unified Command;
Acquiring and allocating resources required by incident management personnel in concert with the priorities established by Incident or Unified Command;
Anticipating and identifying future resource requirements;
Coordinating and resolving policy issues arising from the incident(s); and
Providing strategic coordination as required.

See also
 Multi-agency coordination

References

Incident management